Robert Dawson (born 1950 in Sacramento) is an American photographer and instructor of photography at San Jose State University and Stanford University. He received a 2014 Guggenheim Fellowship for photography. Much of his photography has focused on California and its natural landscapes. In 2014, he published The Public Library, a book of photographs of public libraries across the United States taken over an eighteen-year period. He earned a BA from the University of California, Santa Cruz and a master's degree from San Francisco State University. His work has been exhibited or held in the permanent collections of institutions such as the Museum of Modern Art, the Bibliothèque Nationale de France, and the Library of Congress.

References

External links
Official website

1950 births
Artists from Sacramento, California
Photographers from California
San Jose State University faculty
San Francisco State University alumni
Stanford University faculty
University of California, Santa Cruz alumni
Living people